This is an incomplete list of ghost towns in Pennsylvania. 

Many of the ghost towns in Pennsylvania are located in Western Pennsylvania, particularly in the Appalachian and Allegheny regions. During the late 19th century and early 20th century, the mountainous parts of Pennsylvania were home to a booming coal industry. Many of these towns also housed coking facilities for the coal mined nearby, many of which still have the remains of the abandoned coke ovens.

Classifications

Barren site 

 Sites no longer in existence
 Sites that have been destroyed
 Covered with water
 Reverted to pasture
 May have a few difficult to find foundations/footings at most

Neglected site 

 Only rubble left
 All buildings uninhabited
 Roofless building ruins
 Some buildings or houses still standing, but majority are roofless

Abandoned site 

 Building or houses still standing
 Buildings and houses all abandoned
 No population, except caretaker
 Site no longer in existence except for one or two buildings, for example old church, grocery store

Semi abandoned site 

 Building or houses still standing
 Buildings and houses largely abandoned
 few residents
 many abandoned buildings
 Small population

Historic community 

 Building or houses still standing
 Still a busy community
 Smaller than its boom years
 Population has decreased dramatically, to one fifth or less.

List of towns

See also 
Kinzua Dam
Rust Belt
Night in the Woods, which takes place in the fictional semi-abandoned town of Possum Springs inspired by the creator's hometown in Pennsylvania.
Coal mining in the United States
Pennsylvania
List of cities in Pennsylvania
List of towns and boroughs in Pennsylvania
List of counties in Pennsylvania

References 

 
Pennsyl
Ghost towns
Ghost